A well-known URI is a Uniform Resource Identifier for URL path prefixes that start with /.well-known/. They are implemented in webservers so that requests to the servers for well-known services or information are available at URLs consistent well-known locations across servers.

Description 

Well-known URIs are Uniform Resource Identifiers defined by the IETF in RFC 8615. They are URL path prefixes that start with /.well-known/. This implementation is in response to the common expectation for web-based protocols to require certain services or information be available at URLs consistent across servers, regardless of the way URL paths are organized on a particular host. The URIs implemented in webservers so that requests to the servers for well-known services or information are available at URLs consistent well-known locations across servers.

The IETF has defined a simple way for web servers to hold metadata that any user agent (e.g., web browser) can request. The metadata is useful for various tasks, including directing a web user to use a mobile app instead of the website or indicating the different ways that the site can be secured. The well-known locations are used by web servers to share metadata with user agents; sometimes these are files and sometimes these are requests for information from the web server software itself. The way to declare the different metadata requests that can be provided is standardized by the IETF so that other developers know how to find and use this information.

Use 
The path well-known URI begins with the characters /.well-known/, and whose scheme is "HTTP", "HTTPS", or another scheme that has explicitly been specified to use well-known URIs. As an example, if an application hosts the service "example", the corresponding well-known URIs on https://www.example.com/ would start with https://www.example.com/.well-known/example.

Information shared by a web site as a well-known service is expected to meet a specific standard. Specifications that need to define a resource for such site-wide metadata can register their use with Internet Assigned Numbers Authority (IANA) to avoid collisions and minimize impingement upon sites' URI space.

List of well-known URIs 
The list below describes known standards for .well-known services that a web server can implement.

References

Footnotes

Well-known services
Hypertext Transfer Protocol
Request for Comments